Hillsborough is a mixed industrial and residential suburb of Christchurch, New Zealand, located approximately  to the south-east of the city centre. 

The area was first owned by Edward Garland, who initially called it Broomfield Farm after settling the land with his wife Annie in 1854. Garland grazed cattle on the low-lying land south of the Ōpāwaho / Heathcote River, and sheep on the slopes of the Port Hills. It is unclear when the farm was given the name Hillsborough, however the name Broomfield eventually fell into disuse as the area developed. By the area's integration into greater Christchurch in 1945, the name Hillsborough was exclusively used. Despite this, the area's early history is still reflected in some street names, with a main thoroughfare of the suburb - Garlands Road - named for the Garland family and following the route of their original driveway.

The suburb's residential and industrial areas are largely divided, with much of the land around the base of the Port Hills in the suburb's south zoned industrial and residential areas further north, near the Ōpāwaho. The area around the base of the hills has long been used for industrial purposes, and was formerly occupied by multiple brickworks.

Demographics

Hillsborough had a population of 2,370 at the 2018 New Zealand census, an increase of 144 people (6.5%) since the 2013 census, and a decrease of 162 people (-6.4%) since the 2006 census. There were 897 households. There were 1,200 males and 1,170 females, giving a sex ratio of 1.03 males per female. The median age was 40 years (compared with 37.4 years nationally), with 456 people (19.2%) aged under 15 years, 405 (17.1%) aged 15 to 29, 1,146 (48.4%) aged 30 to 64, and 360 (15.2%) aged 65 or older.

Ethnicities were 90.5% European/Pākehā, 8.9% Māori, 2.2% Pacific peoples, 4.7% Asian, and 2.2% other ethnicities (totals add to more than 100% since people could identify with multiple ethnicities).

The proportion of people born overseas was 22.2%, compared with 27.1% nationally.

Although some people objected to giving their religion, 55.7% had no religion, 32.8% were Christian, 0.4% were Hindu, 0.3% were Muslim, 0.6% were Buddhist and 2.9% had other religions.

Of those at least 15 years old, 621 (32.4%) people had a bachelor or higher degree, and 243 (12.7%) people had no formal qualifications. The median income was $38,300, compared with $31,800 nationally. The employment status of those at least 15 was that 996 (52.0%) people were employed full-time, 318 (16.6%) were part-time, and 48 (2.5%) were unemployed.

Notes

References

Suburbs of Christchurch